Khuwayr Kadra' or Tawi al Khuwayr is a community in Ibri Province, Ad Dhahirah Governorate, Oman.

References

 http://www.geographic.org/geographic_names/name.php?uni=-1134799&fid=4001&c=oman

Populated places in Ad Dhahirah North Governorate